William Henry Collings  (July 6, 1899 – March 7, 1961) was a Canadian politician, who represented Beaches in the Legislative Assembly of Ontario from 1951 to 1961 as a Progressive Conservative member.

Background
Collings was born in York County, Ontario to Thomas Collings and Elizabeth Ann Mortimore. He was one of the last members of the Orange Lodge to win political office, municipally or provincially. He had two sons and one daughter.

Politics

Municipal
Collings was elected as an Alderman representing Ward 8 on Toronto City Council in 1948. He was re-elected in 1949 but, in 1950, he was unsuccessful in an effort to secure a position on the Toronto Board of Control.

Provincial
He was elected in the general election in 1951 and was re-elected in the general elections in 1955 and 1959 but died in office halfway through his third term. During his first term in office, he served on variety of Standing Committees and he was elected Chair of two Select Committees - the Select Committee on Election Laws and the Select Committee on the Representation Act. He served as a member of more Standing Committees after the 1955 and 1959 elections, sitting on up to ten committees, simultaneously.

In 1955, Collings was appointed as the Chief Commissioner of the Liquor Control Board of Ontario and served in that role until his death. He was credited with many of the steps taken to liberalize the advertising and promotion of alcoholic products in Ontario. He was credited by Premier John Robarts as being one of the principal authors of the legislation which created the City of Metropolitan Toronto in 1953.

Provincial electoral record

References

External links 
 

1899 births
1961 deaths
Progressive Conservative Party of Ontario MPPs
Toronto city councillors